Skuli Gudmundur "Skull" Jonsson (September 14, 1892 – December 28, 1943) was a Canadian professional ice hockey player. He played with the Quebec Bulldogs of the National Hockey Association (NHA) during the 1915–16 and 1916–17 seasons.

References

1892 births
1943 deaths
Canadian ice hockey forwards
Ice hockey people from Manitoba
People from Selkirk, Manitoba
Quebec Bulldogs (NHA) players